Wayne Portlock is an Australian former professional rugby league footballer who played in the 1980s and 1990s. He played for Eastern Suburbs and North Sydney in the NSWRL competition and for Hull F.C. in the England.

Playing career
Portlock made his first grade debut for North Sydney against defending premiers Parramatta in round 2 of the 1984 NSWRL season at Belmore Sports Ground. Portlock finished as the clubs second highest point scorer for the year. In 1985, Portlock joined Eastern Suburbs where he spent the next six seasons. In 1991, Portlock joined English side Hull F.C. where he played one season. He finished his career in the Group 9 Rugby League competition with the Young Cherrypickers.

Post playing
Following retirement, Portlock coached North Sydney at SG Ball, Jersey Flegg and NSW Cup levels. In 1999, he became a development officer with the New South Wales rugby league.

References

Hull F.C. players
North Sydney Bears players
Sydney Roosters players
Year of birth missing (living people)
Australian rugby league players
Rugby league fullbacks
Living people